The Last Mission of Demolitions Man Cloud is a 1978 Yugoslav feature film directed by Vatroslav Mimica.

External links

The Last Mission of Demolitions Man Cloud at hrfilm.hr 

1978 films
Croatian drama films
Yugoslav drama films
Serbo-Croatian-language films
Films directed by Vatroslav Mimica